Eubranchus exiguus is a species of small sea slug, an aeolid nudibranch, a marine gastropod mollusc in the family Eubranchidae.

Distribution 
The type locality is the harbour at Fowey, in England. It is found all round the British Isles and from the Arctic and Scandinavia to the Mediterranean Sea.

Description 
Eubranchus exiguus was originally discovered and described (under the name Eolis exigua) in 1848, by the British malacologists Joshua Alder and Albany Hancock.

The original text (the type description) reads as follows:

The maximum recorded length is 8 mm.

Habitat 
Minimum recorded depth is 0 m. Maximum recorded depth is 10 m.

References
This article incorporates public domain text from the reference.

External links 

 http://www.seaslugforum.net/eubrexig.htm

Eubranchidae
Gastropods described in 1848